Bleialf is a municipality in the district of Bitburg-Prüm, in Rhineland-Palatinate, western Germany.

Geography 
Bleialf lies in the North Eifel Nature Park. 
The Alfbach stream flows through the village.

Attractions 
There is an ancient mine shaft and tunnels that are no longer in use, which now are open to public.

References

Bitburg-Prüm